The Guatemalan ambassador to the Italian Government in Rome is the official representative of the Government in Guatemala City to the Government of Italy.

List of representatives

References 

 
Italy
Guatemala